Herman Peltzer  ( – ) was a Dutch footballer. He was part of the Netherlands national football team, playing 1 match on 11 December 1909.

See also
 List of Dutch international footballers

References

1887 births
1957 deaths
Dutch footballers
Netherlands international footballers
People from Sidoarjo Regency

Association footballers not categorized by position